Standing Woman is a bronze sculpture by Gaston Lachaise.

It is one of at least two statues of that name created by Lachaise, the other is often referred to as Standing Woman (Elevation) because the figure appears to be lifting up, as opposed to this work in which, "it is the reverse of buoyancy that is sought. This is a triumphant figure of earth."   The model for both statues was Lachaise's wife Isabel Dutaud Nagle, "his model, his muse and his abiding inspiration." 

Modeled in 1930, it was cast in 1932. It was an edition of 8, examples are at the Franklin D. Murphy Sculpture Garden, Milwaukee Art Museum, The Brooklyn Museum, The Museum of Modern Art, Hirshhorn Museum and Sculpture Garden., and in the Tuileries Garden

References

External links
DC Memorials
Bluffton

1932 sculptures
Art in Washington, D.C.
Sculptures of the Smithsonian Institution
Bronze sculptures in California
Bronze sculptures in Wisconsin
Bronze sculptures in New York City
Bronze sculptures in Washington, D.C.
Statues in California
Statues in New York City
Sculptures of women in Washington, D.C.
Nude sculptures
Statues in the United States
Hirshhorn Museum and Sculpture Garden
Sculptures of the Museum of Modern Art (New York City)
Collection of the Brooklyn Museum
Bronze sculptures in Brooklyn